The 2018 College Football Playoff National Championship was a college football bowl game played on January 8, 2018, at Mercedes-Benz Stadium in Atlanta, Georgia, and was televised nationally by ESPN. The fourth College Football Playoff National Championship, the game determined a national champion in the NCAA Division I Football Bowl Subdivision for the 2017 season. Aside from the all star games following this, this was the cumulating game of the 2017-18 bowl season. Sponsored by telecommunications company AT&T, the game was officially known as the 2018 College Football Playoff National Championship presented by AT&T. 

The Alabama Crimson Tide coming back from a 13–0 deficit at halftime, defeated the Georgia Bulldogs 26–23. This was the first CFP National Championship game to be decided into overtime, and the first overtime National Championship game since the 2003 Fiesta Bowl. True freshman quarterback Tua Tagovailoa and defensive tackle Daron Payne were respectively named the offensive and defensive players of the game.

The College Football Playoff selection committee chose the semifinalists following the conclusion of the 2017 regular season. Alabama and Georgia advanced to the national championship after winning the semifinal games hosted by the Sugar Bowl and Rose Bowl Game respectively on January 1, 2018.

Background

The Mercedes-Benz Stadium in Atlanta, Georgia was announced as the host site for the fourth College Football National Championship on November 4, 2015.

2018 College Football Playoff
The College Football Playoff (CFP) selection committee selected four teams to advance to the playoff: the Clemson Tigers, Oklahoma Sooners, Georgia Bulldogs, and Alabama Crimson Tide. The semifinals were played on January 1, 2018. The first semifinal, played at the Rose Bowl, Georgia won 54-48, after a 27 yard run by Sony Michel, shortly after a blocked Oklahoma field goal in the second overtime. In the second semifinal, played at the Sugar Bowl, Alabama defeated defending national champion Clemson 24-6.

Teams

Alabama

The Alabama Crimson Tide defeated the Clemson Tigers in the 2018 Sugar Bowl by a score of 24–6 to reach the championship game. The Tide had a 12–1 season, becoming the SEC West Division co-champions with the Auburn Tigers. The Crimson Tide were coached by Nick Saban.

Georgia

The Georgia Bulldogs defeated the Oklahoma Sooners in the 2018 Rose Bowl by a score of 54–48 in double overtime to reach the championship game. The Bulldogs had a 13–1 season claiming their 13th Southeastern Conference (SEC) championship with a rematch victory over the Auburn Tigers, 28–7. The Bulldogs were coached by Kirby Smart.

Starting lineups

Source:

Game summary

First half
After winning the coin toss, Alabama deferred to the second half and Georgia received the ball to begin the game. After two plays, quarterback Jake Fromm attempted a pass downfield and was intercepted by Tony Brown. Alabama began their first drive of the game, and, after eleven plays, that drive ended with kicker Andy Pappanastos missing a 40-yard field goal. The teams each had three-and-outs for the game's first two punts. During Georgia's ensuing drive, the quarter ended, with no score.

After a failed third down conversion, on the second play of the second quarter, Georgia kicker Rodrigo Blankenship hit a 41-yard field goal to open the scoring and put Georgia in the lead by three. Alabama's ensuing drive went nowhere, as they gained four yards on three plays and punted. Georgia took the ball and drove down the field, and found themselves with a first and goal at the Alabama 10-yard-line; the Tide defense held, however, and the Bulldogs settled for a second field goal and took a 6–0 lead with just over seven and a half minutes until half. On Alabama's next drive, the Georgia defense held yet again and Alabama's J. K. Scott punted for the third time. Just prior to the punt, Georgia wide receiver Javon Wims was shown walking to the locker room, reportedly with a left shoulder injury. Both defenses then forced punts, and Georgia took back over with 1:19 remaining in the half on their own 31-yard-line. Nine plays later, on Alabama's 1-yard-line, Mecole Hardman took a direct snap, faked a handoff, and ran into the end zone for the game's first touchdown, putting Georgia up 13–0 going into halftime.

Second half
Because they deferred the coin toss, Alabama received the ball first in the second half. They started their drive on their own 22-yard-line. Tua Tagovailoa, Alabama's backup quarterback, started the second half for the Tide; that drive quickly resulted in a three-and-out. The initial punt was blocked, but an offside call gave the Tide another chance to punt. Georgia started their drive on their own 36-yard-line, but punted on 4th & 17. Alabama took over on their own 44-yard-line. The teams then traded touchdowns on consecutive drives; Alabama scored their first points of the game on a 6-yard pass from Tagovailoa to Ruggs, but Georgia immediately responded with an 80-yard touchdown connection from Fromm to Mecole Hardman, putting Georgia up 20–7. On the second play of Alabama's ensuing drive, Tagovailoa, while scrambling to the left, threw into traffic and was intercepted by Georgia's Deandre Baker. Up 13, the Bulldogs took over possession of the ball on Alabama's 39-yard-line. The Tide defense responded immediately, however, as Raekwon Davis intercepted a Jake Fromm pass on the first play of Georgia's drive, returning the pick to the UGA 40-yard-line. The Tide gained fifteen yards on six plays and kicker Andy Pappanastos avenged his earlier miss with a 43-yard field goal that put Bama within ten. The teams then traded punts. Just prior to Alabama's punt, it was announced that an Alabama defensive back, Kyriq McDonald, had collapsed on the sideline; the situation was described as a "serious medical emergency". He was loaded onto a medical stretcher awake and conscious. Georgia could not muster anything on offense that drive, and punted. The fourth quarter saw Tagovailoa lead the Tide to come back and tie the game at 20 with 3:49. Alabama regained possession, and with three seconds remaining in the game, Andy Pappanastos missed a potential game-winning 36-yard field goal wide left, sending the CFP Championship to overtime, the first in the era.

Overtime
In overtime, Georgia had an unsuccessful drive that resulted in both a three-and-out, and a 13-yard loss sack to Fromm.  Georgia opted to attempt a 51-yard field goal, which they made. On Alabama's first offensive play in overtime, Tagovailoa was sacked for a 16-yard loss, but immediately followed that with a game-winning 41-yard touchdown pass to DeVonta Smith, in a play that has since been called 2nd and 26 by fans. Tagovailoa was named the offensive player of the game, and Daron Payne was named the defensive player of the game.

Scoring summary

Statistics

Broadcasting
The game was televised nationally by ESPN and ESPN Radio. On January 8, 2018, the network announced that its broadcast would feature a live performance by Kendrick Lamar during halftime. This performance was separate from the event proper at Mercedes-Benz Stadium (which featured a traditional halftime show with the marching bands of the participating teams), and originated from Centennial Olympic Park.

See also
 Alabama–Georgia football rivalry
 College football national championships in NCAA Division I FBS
 Super Bowl LIII, the NFL championship game contested at the same venue on February 3, 2019

References

External links
 

2017–18 NCAA football bowl games
National Championship
2018 in sports in Georgia (U.S. state)
2018 College Football Playoff National Championship
2018 in Atlanta
2018
2018
January 2018 sports events in the United States